Tom Hanlin (28 August 1907 – 7 April 1953) was a Scottish fiction writer, known for writing a number of novels which were influential and sold widely.

Life 

Hanlin was born in Armadale, West Lothian on 28 August 1907. At the age of 14 he left school and worked on a farm for a year, then got a job at a mine where he worked for the next twenty years. While working as a miner he began to study at a journalism school in Glasgow. After a workplace accident in 1945, he spent three months in the Royal Infirmary, and he began to write stories and sell them, thus realising his childhood dream.

Hanlin died at home on 7 April 1953, after developing heart and breathing problems.

Writing 

During his lifetime, Hanlin wrote over thirty short stories, several novels and essays, and eight radio plays, two of which were broadcast. Once in Every Lifetime, published in 1945, was his most popular novel, selling 250,000 copies in the United Kingdom in the first three weeks of publication. It also won the £500 first prize in the Big Ben Books Competition, and was translated into more than a dozen languages.

Once in Every Lifetime was serialised in Woman's Home Companion, and a radio version was later broadcast on BBC Radio. Norman Collins, writing in the Observer, wrote that "his novel is an idyll of young love that somehow became sour and unlovely amid the grim landscape of the pitheads.  It is brief, moving in places, almost unbearably so, and often beautiful.  In short Mr. Hanlin is a remarkable fellow." John Steinbeck also spoke enthusiastically of the author, declaring the book "excellent."

In his writing Hanlin draws on the themes of love and religion, but always in the context of the gritty realism and poverty of life in a small mining town.  The Scotsman review of The Miracle at Cardenrigg notes "Tom Hanlin uses a miraculously averted pit disaster to bring into sharp focus the life of a Scottish mining community and to present his Catholic and predominantly tragic view of earthly life."

Short stories and articles 
 "Temper the Wind", Virginia Quarterly, Autumn 1945
 "Bright and Cheerful is the Day", Virginia Quarterly, Autumn 1945
 "My Shadow on the Side of the Tunnel", Lilliput, May 1945, Vol. 16
 "And Always will be", Lilliput, May 1945, Vol. 16
 "Strange the Way", Lilliput, May 1945, Vol. 16
 "The Fair" Lilliput, May 1945, Vol. 16
 "The Road isn't Always Broad", Story Magazine, 1946, Jul–Aug., Vol. 29
 "Over a Lifetime you may", Good Housekeeping, 1947
 "One More Chance, a story", Modern Reading 16, edited by Reginald Moore, Phoenix House Limited 
 "The Novel is Doomed"
 "Tension-Snap-Relief"
 "Sunday in the Village"

Novels 
 Once in Every Lifetime, Nicholson & Watson, 1945 (serialised in Woman's Home Companion, Nov 1945)
 Yesterday will Return, Nicholson & Watson, 1946 (republished as Mima, Bantam Books, New York 1952)
 The Miracle at Cardenrigg, 1949
 Nor is the Night Starless

Plays 
 One More Chance
 Beneath the Surface

Awards 
 Arthur Markham Memorial Prize awarded by Sheffield University, for the essay Sunday in the Village in April 1944 
 Big Ben Book Competition, first prize of £500, for Once in Every Lifetime

Further reading 
 National Library of Scotland: MSS.27417 – 27425
 Scottish Writers: Tom Hanlin by Hugh Macpherson in the Scottish Book Collector, First Series, No.10, (Edinburgh, Feb. 1989), pp19–20
 Pithead Metaphysics: Tom Hanlin’s Once in Every Lifetime by Manfred Malzahn in ScotLit No 8 (Aberdeen: Association for Scottish Literary Studies, Autumn 1992), pp. 3–4.
 Once in Every Lifetime reviewed by Carlos Baker (Virginia Quarterly Review, 1946, published by University of Virginia)
 Review of Tom Hanlin's writing in Annals of Scotland, 1895–1955, ("An Essay on the Twentieth-century Scottish Novel", Related to a Series of Programmes with the Same Title to be Broadcast by the BBC for Winter Listening, 1956–57) by George Blake, pub 1956 by BBC
 West Lothian Heritage, Newsletter of West Lothian Heritage Services. Article about Hanlin on page 5 
 The Scotsman book review of The Miracle at Cardenrigg
 The Scotsman book review of Once in Every Lifetime
 The Guardian book review of Once in Every Lifetime
 The Guardian book review of The Miracle at Cardenrigg
 The Observer book review of Once in Every Lifetime 
 The Observer book review of The Miracle at Cardenrigg
 The Times Literary Supplement book review of The Miracle at Cardenrigg
 The New York Times book review of The Miracle at Cardenrigg
 The Toronto Daily Star book review of Once in Every Lifetime
 Contention in a Bitter World Nathan L Rothman reviewing Yesterday Will Return in The Saturday Review, 9 November 1946
 Hunger for Life. Slaten Bray reviewing Once in Every Lifetime in The New Masses, 26 March 1946
 Drowning Underground John Cournos reviewing Miracle at Cardenrigg in The Saturday Review 27 August 1949
 Conversations with John Steinbeck John Steinbeck, Thomas Fensch, Univ. Press of Mississippi 1988

References

External links 
 Tom Hanlin's Yesterday Will Return from the Hathi Trust Digital Library
 Armadale Community Website's Tom Hanlin Page
 West Lothian Council's Heritage Newsletter

1907 births
1953 deaths
Scottish novelists
Scottish essayists
Scottish dramatists and playwrights
Scottish short story writers
Scottish radio writers
People from West Lothian
Scottish miners
British Roman Catholics
Scottish Roman Catholics
People from Armadale, West Lothian
20th-century British novelists
20th-century British dramatists and playwrights
20th-century British short story writers
20th-century essayists